Freyburg may refer to:
 Germany
 Freyburg, Germany
 United States
 Freyburg, Ohio
 Freyburg, Texas

See also

 Freiberg (disambiguation)
 Freiburg (disambiguation)
 Freyberg
 Friberg
 Fribourg (disambiguation)
 Fryeburg (disambiguation)